The 2006 NBA draft was held on June 28, 2006, at the Theatre at Madison Square Garden in New York City and was broadcast in the United States on ESPN. In this draft, National Basketball Association (NBA) teams took turns selecting amateur U.S. college basketball players and other eligible players, including international players. This was also the only time the New Orleans Hornets would draft under the temporary name of the New Orleans/Oklahoma City Hornets as the city of New Orleans was still recovering from the events of Hurricane Katrina after the 2005-06 NBA season.

Italian Andrea Bargnani was selected first overall by Toronto Raptors, who won the draft lottery. He became the second player without competitive experience in the United States to be drafted first overall. Prior to the draft he was playing with Italian club Benetton Treviso for 3 years. Sixth overall pick Brandon Roy from University of Washington was named Rookie of the Year for the 2006–07 season. Roy was originally drafted by Minnesota Timberwolves but his draft rights were traded to Portland Trail Blazers on draft day. Portland also acquired the draft rights to second overall pick from University of Texas, LaMarcus Aldridge from Chicago Bulls on draft day.

The University of Connecticut had four players selected in the first round, tying the record set by Duke University in 1999 and the University of North Carolina in 2005. These players were Rudy Gay, Hilton Armstrong, Marcus Williams, and Josh Boone. With Denham Brown also selected in the second round, Connecticut became the first school ever to have five players selected in a two-round draft. Connecticut joined eight other schools that had five players selected in a single draft, second only to the UNLV, who had six players selected in the eight-round 1977 draft. As of 2022, Rudy Gay, Kyle Lowry, and P. J. Tucker are the only remaining active players from this draft class.

Draft selections

Notable undrafted players
Some of these players not selected in this year's draft have played in the NBA.

Eligibility

The new collective bargaining agreement between the NBA and the National Basketball Players Association (NBPA) took into effect starting in this year's draft. Under the new agreement, high school players were not eligible for selection. The new rules stated that high school players must wait one year after their high school class graduates and must be at least 19 years old to be eligible for the draft.

The basic requirements for draft eligibility are:
 All drafted players must be at least 19 years of age during the calendar year of the draft (i.e. born on or before December 31, 1987, for the 2006 draft).
 Any player who is not an "international player", as defined in the Collective Bargaining Agreement (CBA), must be at least one year removed from the graduation of his high school class.

The CBA defines "international players" as players who permanently resided outside the U.S. for three years before the draft, did not complete high school in the U.S., and have never enrolled at a U.S. college or university.

The basic requirement for automatic eligibility for a U.S. player is the completion of his college eligibility. Players who meet the CBA definition of "international players" are automatically eligible if their 22nd birthday falls during or before the calendar year of the draft (i.e., born on or before December 31, 1984, for the 2006 draft).

A player who is not automatically eligible must declare his eligibility for the draft by notifying the NBA offices in writing no later than 60 days before the draft. An early entry candidate is allowed to withdraw his eligibility for the draft by notifying the NBA offices in writing no later than 10 days before the draft. On June 19, 2006, NBA announced that 37 college players and 10 international players had filed as early-entry candidates for the 2006 Draft, while 47 players who had previously declared as early entry candidates had withdrawn from the draft.

Early entrants

College underclassmen
The following college basketball players successfully applied for early draft entrance.

  LaMarcus Aldridge – F, Texas (sophomore)
  Renaldo Balkman – F, South Carolina (junior)
  Will Blalock – G, Iowa State (junior)
  Josh Boone – F, Connecticut (junior)
  Ronnie Brewer – G, Arkansas (junior)
  Shannon Brown – G, Michigan State (junior)
  Derek Burditt – F, Blinn (sophomore)
  Travis DeGroot – G, Delta State (junior)
  Guillermo Diaz – G, Miami (Florida) (junior)
  Quincy Douby – G, Rutgers (junior)
  Michael Efevberha – G, Cal State Northridge (junior)
  Jordan Farmar – G, UCLA (sophomore)
  Thomas Gardner – G, Missouri (junior)
  Rudy Gay – F, Connecticut (sophomore)
  Daniel Gibson – G, Texas (sophomore)
  LeShawn Hammett – G, Saint Francis (PA) (junior)
  Tedric Hill – F, Gulf Coast State (sophomore)
  Donald Jeffes – G, Roxbury CC (sophomore)
  Alexander Johnson – F, Florida State (junior)
  Dave Johnson – F, Clinton JC (sophomore)
  Mark Konecny – F, Lambuth (junior)
  Kyle Lowry – G, Villanova (sophomore)
  Paul Millsap – F, Louisiana Tech (junior)
  Matt Mitchell – G, Southern–New Orleans (junior)
  Adam Morrison – F, Gonzaga (junior)
  Patrick O'Bryant – C, Bradley (sophomore)
  J. R. Pinnock – G, George Washington (junior)
  Leon Powe – F, California (sophomore)
  Rajon Rondo – G, Kentucky (sophomore)
  Cedric Simmons – F, NC State (sophomore)
  Marcus Slaughter – F, San Diego State (junior)
  Curtis Stinson – G, Iowa State (junior)
  Tyrus Thomas – F, LSU (freshman)
  P. J. Tucker – F/G, Texas (junior)
  Darius Washington Jr. – G, Memphis (sophomore)
  Marcus Williams – G, Connecticut (junior)
  Shawne Williams – F, Memphis (freshman)

International players
The following international players successfully applied for early draft entrance.

  Pape-Philippe Amagou – G, Le Mans (France)
  Andrea Bargnani – F, Benetton Treviso (Italy)
  Lior Eliyahu – F, Hapoel Galil Elyon (Israel)
  Damir Markota – F, Cibona Zagreb (Croatia)
  Oleksiy Pecherov – F, BC Kyiv (Ukraine)
  Kosta Perović – C, Partizan Belgrade (Serbia)
  Sergio Rodríguez – G, Adecco Estudiantes (Spain)
  Mouhamed Sene – C, Verviers-Pepinster (Belgium)
  Ejike Ugboaja – F, Union Bank Lagos (Nigeria)

Draft lottery

The first 14 picks in the draft belonged to teams that had missed the playoffs; the order was determined through a lottery. The lottery would determine the three teams that would obtain the first three picks on the draft. The remaining first-round picks and the second-round picks were assigned to teams in reverse order of their win–loss record in the previous season. On April 20, 2007, the NBA performed a tie-breaker to determine the order of the picks for teams with identical win–loss record.

The 2006 Draft Lottery was held on May 23, 2006, in Secaucus, New Jersey. The Toronto Raptors, who had the fifth-worst record, won the lottery with just 8.8% chance to win. The Chicago Bulls, who acquired the New York Knicks' first-round draft pick from a previous trade, landed the second overall pick. The Portland Trail Blazers who had the best chance to land the top pick fell out of the top three and had to settle with 4th pick. Portland's 4th pick was the lowest possible pick that Portland could obtained through the lottery.

Below were the chances for each team to get specific picks in the 2006 draft lottery, rounded to three decimal places:

Trades involving draft picks

Draft-day trades

The following trades involving drafted players were made on the day of the draft.
 Portland acquired the draft rights to 2nd pick LaMarcus Aldridge and a 2007 second-round draft pick from Chicago in exchange for the draft rights to 4th pick Tyrus Thomas and Viktor Khryapa.
 Portland acquired the draft rights to 6th pick Brandon Roy from Minnesota in exchange for the draft rights to 7th pick Randy Foye. Previously, Portland acquired the draft rights to 7th pick Randy Foye, Raef LaFrentz and Dan Dickau from Boston in exchange for Sebastian Telfair, Theo Ratliff and a 2008 second-round draft pick.
 Memphis acquired the draft rights to 8th pick Rudy Gay and Stromile Swift from Houston in exchange for Shane Battier. The trade was finalized on July 12, 2006.
 Chicago acquired the draft rights to 13th pick Thabo Sefolosha from Philadelphia in exchange for the draft rights to 16th pick Rodney Carney, a 2007 second-round draft pick and cash considerations.
 Boston acquired the draft rights to 21st pick Rajon Rondo, Brian Grant and cash considerations from Phoenix in exchange for a 2007 first-round draft pick.
 Portland acquired the draft rights to 27th pick Sergio Rodríguez from Phoenix in exchange for cash considerations.
 Memphis acquired the draft rights to 45th pick Alexander Johnson from Portland in exchange for a 2008 second-round draft pick. Previously, Portland acquired the draft rights to 45th pick Alexander Johnson, 2007 and 2008 second-round draft picks from Indiana in exchange for the draft rights to 31st pick James White.
 Philadelphia acquired the draft rights to 37th pick Bobby Jones from Minnesota in exchange for a 2007 second-round draft pick and cash considerations.
 Houston acquired the draft rights to 44th pick Lior Eliyahu from Orlando in exchange for cash considerations.
 Boston acquired the draft rights to 49th pick Leon Powe from Denver in exchange for a 2007 second-round draft pick.
 Detroit acquired the draft rights to 51st pick Cheikh Samb from the L.A. Lakers in exchange for Maurice Evans.
 Philadelphia acquired the draft rights to 56th pick Edin Bavčić from Toronto in exchange for cash considerations.
 The L.A. Lakers acquired the draft rights to 58th pick J. R. Pinnock from Dallas in exchange for a 2007 second-round draft pick.
 Milwaukee acquired the draft rights to 59th pick Damir Markota from San Antonio in exchange for a 2007 second-round draft pick.

Pre-draft trades
Prior to the day of the draft, the following trades were made and resulted in exchanges of draft picks between the teams.
 On October 4, 2005, Chicago acquired a 2006 first-round draft pick, an option to exchange 2007 first-round draft picks, 2007 and 2009 second-round draft picks, Tim Thomas, Michael Sweetney and Jermaine Jackson from New York in exchange for Eddy Curry and Antonio Davis. Chicago used the 2nd pick to draft LaMarcus Aldridge.
 On October 26, 2005, New Orleans/Oklahoma City acquired a 2006 first-round draft pick, Desmond Mason and cash considerations from Milwaukee in exchange for Jamaal Magloire. New Orleans/Oklahoma City used the 15th pick to draft Cedric Simmons.
 On February 3, 2006, New York acquired Denver's 2006 first-round draft pick and Jalen Rose from Toronto in exchange for Antonio Davis. Previously, Toronto acquired Philadelphia's 2005 and Denver's 2006 first-round draft picks, Alonzo Mourning, Eric Williams, Aaron Williams on December 17, 2004, from New Jersey in exchange for Vince Carter. Previously, New Jersey acquired Philadelphia's 2005, Denver's 2006 and L.A. Clippers' 2006 first-round draft picks on July 15, 2004, from Denver in exchange for Kenyon Martin. New York used the 20th pick to draft Renaldo Balkman.
 On August 19, 2005, Phoenix acquired L.A. Lakers' 2006 and Atlanta's 2007 first-round draft picks and Boris Diaw from Atlanta in exchange for Joe Johnson. Previously, Atlanta acquired L.A. Lakers' 2006 first-round draft pick, Gary Payton, Tom Gugliotta and Michael Stewart on February 24, 2005, from Boston in exchange for Antoine Walker. Previously, Boston acquired a 2006 first-round draft pick, Gary Payton, Rick Fox and cash considerations on August 13, 2004, from the L.A. Lakers in exchange for Chris Mihm, Chucky Atkins and Jumaine Jones. Phoenix used the 21st pick to draft Rajon Rondo.
 On July 15, 2005, New Jersey acquired Philadelphia's 2005, Denver's 2006 and L.A. Clippers' 2006 first-round draft picks from Denver in exchange for Kenyon Martin. Previously, Denver acquired L.A. Clippers' 2006 first-round draft pick and Don Reid on August 1, 2002, from Orlando in exchange for a 2004 second-round draft pick. Previously, Orlando acquired a first-round draft pick on June 28, 2006, from the L.A. Clippers in exchange for Corey Maggette, Derek Strong, the draft rights to Keyon Dooling, a 2000 second-round draft pick and cash considerations. New Jersey used the 22nd pick to draft Marcus Williams.
 On July 14, 2004, the L.A. Lakers acquired a 2006 first-round draft pick, Lamar Odom, Caron Butler and Brian Grant from Miami in exchange for Shaquille O'Neal. The L.A. Lakers used the 26th pick to draft Jordan Farmar.
 On February 25, 2005, New York acquired Phoenix's 2005 and San Antonio's 2006 first-round draft picks and Malik Rose from San Antonio in exchange for Nazr Mohammed and Jamison Brewer. New York used the 29th pick to draft Mardy Collins.
 On June 28, 2005, Portland acquired Detroit's 2006 first-round draft pick, the 6th and 27th pick in 2005 from Utah in exchange for the 3rd pick in 2005. Previously, Utah acquired a 2006 first-round draft pick and Elden Campbell on January 21, 2005, from Detroit in exchange for Carlos Arroyo. Portland used the 30th pick to draft Joel Freeland.
 On February 24, 2005, Houston acquired a 2006 second-round draft pick, Moochie Norris and Vin Baker from New York Knicks in exchange for Maurice Taylor. New York used the 32nd pick to draft Steve Novak.
 On July 14, 2005, the L.A. Clippers acquired 2005 and 2006 second-round draft picks from Charlotte in exchange for Eddie House and Melvin Ely. The L.A. Clippers used the 34th pick to draft Paul Davis.
 On January 26, 2006, Minnesota acquired 2006 and 2008 second-round draft picks, Ricky Davis, Marcus Banks, Justin Reed and Mark Blount from Boston in exchange for Wally Szczerbiak, Michael Olowokandi, Dwayne Jones and a future first-round draft pick. Minnesota used the 36th pick to draft Craig Smith.
 On February 24, 2005, Milwaukee acquired 2006 and 2007 second-round draft picks and Reece Gaines from Houston in exchange for Mike James and Zendon Hamilton. Milwaukee used the 39th pick to draft David Noel.
 On February 23, 2006, Cleveland acquired a 2006 second-round draft pick and Lee Nailon from Philadelphia in exchange for a conditional 2006 second-round draft pick. The conditional 2006 second-round draft pick was not exercised by Philadelphia. Cleveland used the 42nd pick to draft Daniel Gibson.
 On June 28, 2005, Orlando acquired Milwaukee's 2006 second-round draft pick from Cleveland in exchange for the draft rights to Martynas Andriuškevičius. Previously, Cleveland acquired a 2006 second-round draft pick from Milwaukee in exchange for Jiri Welsch. Orlando used the 44th pick to draft Lior Eliyahu.
 On September 30, 2003, Utah acquired Houston's 2004 first-round draft pick, Chicago's 2005 and 2006 second-round draft picks, Glen Rice and cash considerations from Houston in exchange for John Amaechi and Sacramento's 2004 second-round draft pick. Previously, Houston acquired 2005 and 2006 second-round draft picks on September 28, 2000, from Chicago in exchange for Bryce Drew. Utah used the 46th pick to draft Dee Brown.
 On August 2, 2005, Charlotte acquired a 2006 second-round draft pick from Sacramento in exchange for Jason Hart. Charlotte used the 50th pick to draft Ryan Hollins.
 On June 28, 2005, Seattle acquired 2006 and 2007 second-round draft picks from Memphis in exchange for the draft rights to Lawrence Roberts. Seattle used the 53rd pick to draft Yotam Halperin.
 On January 31, 2006, Toronto acquired Miami's 2006 second-round draft pick and New Orleans's 2009 second-round draft pick  from New Orleans/Oklahoma City in exchange for Aaron Williams. Previously, New Orleans/Oklahoma City acquired Miami's 2006 second-round draft pick on September 30, 2005, from Boston in exchange for Dan Dickau. Previously, Boston acquired 2006 and 2008 second-round draft picks, Qyntel Woods and the draft rights to Albert Miralles on August 8, 2005, from Miami in a five-team trade with Miami, Memphis, New Orleans/Oklahoma City and Utah. Toronto used the 56th pick to draft Edin Bavčić.
 On January 26, 2006, Minnesota acquired a 2006 second-round draft pick from Phoenix in exchange for Nikoloz Tskitishvili. Minnesota used the 57th pick to draft Loukas Mavrokefalidis.

See also
 List of first overall NBA draft picks

References
General

Specific

External links
NBA.com: Draft 2006
NBA.com: NBA Draft Lottery 2006
2006 NBA Draft – Basketball – Reference.com

Draft
National Basketball Association draft
NBA draft
NBA draft
2000s in Manhattan
Basketball in New York City
Sporting events in New York City
Sports in Manhattan
Madison Square Garden